Janek Tombak (born 22 July 1976 in Põltsamaa) is an Estonian former professional road cyclist. He won the Estonian national championships twice (2001, 2003) and finished in 10th place at the 2003 UCI Road World Championships.

Major results

1994
 1st  Overall Tour de Lorraine
1996
 2nd Road race, National Road Championships
1998
 2nd Road race, National Road Championships
2000
 1st Stages 3 and 4a Hessen Rundfahrt
 1st Stage 6 Tour de l'Avenir
 3rd Road race, National Road Championships
2001
 1st  Road race, National Road Championships
 3rd GP Rudy Dhaenens
 6th Overall Guldensporentweedaagse
1st Stage 2
 6th Boucles de l'Aulne
 9th GP Ouest France-Plouay
 9th Route Adélie
2002
 1st Stages 1 & 2 GP Mosqueteiros
 1st Stage 2 Four Days of Dunkirk
 1st Stage 2 Gran Premio Minho
 1st Stage 3 Tour de Pologne
 2nd GP Stad Zottegem
 2nd Tartu Grand Prix
 7th Trophée des Grimpeurs
 8th E.O.S. Tallinn GP
2003
 National Road Championships
1st  Road race
3rd Time trial
 1st Stage 1 Route du Sud
 2nd Tour du Doubs
 2nd Tartu Grand Prix
 6th Paris–Bourges
 7th Le Samyn
 9th Grand Prix de Wallonie
 10th Road race, UCI Road World Championships
2004
 1st Stage 3 Danmark Rundt
 1st 	Points classification Tour of Belgium
 2nd Road race, National Road Championships
 7th E.O.S. Tallinn GP
 8th Brabantse Pijl
 9th Tartu GP
2005
 1st  Overall Tour de Picardie
 1st E.O.S. Tallinn GP
 9th Trophée des Grimpeurs
2006
 1st E.O.S. Tallinn GP
 9th Riga GP
 10th Tartu GP
2007
 1st Halle–Ingooigem
 2nd Overall Tour de Picardie
1st Stage 4
 2nd Grote Prijs Jef Scherens
 3rd Omloop der Kempen
 3rd Cholet-Pays de Loire
 3rd Tartu GP
 5th Druivenkoers Overijse
 6th Paris–Brussels
 7th Overall Boucles de la Mayenne
1st Stage 3
 7th Overall Paris–Corrèze
 7th Internatie Reningelst
 8th Schaal Sels
2008
 1st Cholet-Pays de Loire
 2nd Grote Prijs Jef Scherens
 2nd Grand Prix de la Somme
 2nd Tartu Grand Prix
 4th Road race, National Road Championships
 5th E3 Harelbeke
 8th Druivenkoers Overijse
2009
 1st  Overall Kreiz Breizh Elites
 1st  Overall Boucles de la Mayenne
 3rd Tartu Grand Prix
 5th Overall Boucle de l'Artois
 10th Halle–Ingooigem

References

External links 

Official website 

1976 births
Living people
People from Põltsamaa
Estonian male cyclists
Olympic cyclists of Estonia
Cyclists at the 2000 Summer Olympics
Cyclists at the 2004 Summer Olympics